The 2009 Korea National League was the seventh season of the Korea National League. It was divided in two stages, and the top two clubs of the overall table qualified for the championship playoffs in addition to the winners of each stage. The first stage began on 11 April, and ended on 11 July. The second stage started on 21 August, and ended on 22 November.

Regular season

First stage

Second stage

Overall table

Result

Championship playoffs

Bracket

Semi-finals

Final

Gangneung City won 4–2 on aggregate.

Awards

Main awards

Source:

Best XI

Source:

See also
 2009 in South Korean football
 2009 Korea National League Championship
 2009 Korean FA Cup

References

External links

Korea National League seasons